Nicolae Popa may refer to:

Nicolae Popa (judge) (born 1939), Romanian judge
Nicolae Popa (businessman) (born c. 1965), Romanian businessman